Albert Au Shui Keung is a Hong Kong English pop and Cantopop singer-songwriter and DJ of RTHK.  Albert grew up in Hong Kong, and his ancestral hometown is Zhaoqing city, Guangdong province. A graduate of Hong Kong Baptist University, he debuted in 1979 and achieved considerable fame in the 1980s with his folk music. He also appeared in movies and on TV. He is also operating some music educational establishments.

Albert will have two live shows to be performed at the Hong Kong Cultural Centre on June 21 and 22, 2021, titled "My Home You Will Reunite Concert 2021".   Before that, he performed an online gig on May 14, accompanied by his friends on piano and guitar, it was billed as a prelude to the two live shows.

Filmography
McDull, the Alumni (2006)
Throw Down (2006)
Tigers, The Legend of Canton (Guang Dong wu hu zhi tie quan wu di Sun Zhong Shan) (1993)
Let Us Flirt, Partner (Pai dang chuang qing guan) (1985)
The Return of Pom Pom (1984)
The Militarism Revival (Nu ba tai yang qi) (1983)
Return of the Condor Heroes (Sun diu hap lui) (1983)
Love Encore (TVB 1982)
Sealed with a Kiss (Liang xiao wu zhi) (1981)
Dangerous Encounters of the First Kind (Di yi lei xing wei xian) (1980)

Albums
 Folk Together (Disc 1)
 Folk Together (Disc 2)
 Folk Together (Disc 3)

Covered Songs
 "The Sound of Silence"
 "I'll Have To Say I Love You in a Song"
 "Longer"
 "Vincent"
 "If"
 "You've Got a Friend"
 "Windflowers"
 "Bridge over Trouble Water"
 "Danny's Song"
 "Dust in the Wind"
 "Diary"
 "Perhaps Love"
 "The End of the World"
 "Visions"
 "Love Me Tender"
 "Both Sides Now"
 "Rhinestone Cowboy"
 "Streets of London"
 "House of Rising Sun"
 "Yellow Bird"
 "Try to Remember"
 "Country Roads"
 "When a Child Is Born"

Discography

References

External links

 Current radio programming
 Commercial site
 Commercial site
 Commercial site

Hong Kong male singers
Cantonese-language singers
Cantonese people
English-language singers from Hong Kong
Living people
1955 births
Alumni of Hong Kong Baptist University